is a Japanese manga series written by Dai Tennōji and illustrated Rikiya Gō. It is serialized  in Weekly Manga Goraku magazine by Nihon Bungeisha. The first volume was published in March 1992 and, as of December 2018, the series has 150 volumes. It has been adapted into several live-action films, including original videos and two television films and also into two original video animations.

Characters

 Ginjirō Manda

Media

Films
The first original video film was released on 26 June 1992. The first theatrical film was released on 26 June 1993.

Incomplete list
The King of Minami Returns: Scholarship and Oreore Fraud (2016)
The King of Minami The Movie (2017)
The King of Minami Returns: The Price of a Life (2017)
The King of Minami Returns: Light and Shadow (2017)

Reception
The manga has sold 53 million copies.

See also
List of best-selling manga
List of manga series by volume count

References

External links
 Shin Minami no Teiō on KTV

Business in anime and manga
Manga adapted into films
Nihon Bungeisha manga
Seinen manga